In the United States, future Interstate Highways include proposals to establish new mainline (one- and two-digit) routes to the Interstate Highway System. Excluded from this article are auxiliary Interstate Highways (designated by three-digit numbers) in varying stages of planning and construction, and the planned expansion of existing primary Interstate Highways.

Congressionally designated future Interstates
Several Congressional High Priority Corridors have been designated as future parts of the Interstate Highway System by the Intermodal Surface Transportation Efficiency Act and amendments. By law, they will become interstates when built to Interstate standards and connected to other interstates.

Interstate 3

Interstate 3 is the proposed designation of an Interstate Highway Corridor under development in the Southeastern United States. It is planned to run from Savannah, Georgia, to Knoxville, Tennessee. Its number does not follow standard numbering conventions; under established numbering conventions, I-3 would normally run west of I-5 along the Pacific Coast. The unnumbered Interstate was established by the Safe, Accountable, Flexible, Efficient Transportation Equity Act: A Legacy for Users (SAFETEA-LU) legislation that also provided for Interstate 14. The "Interstate 3" designation has not been officially accepted by American Association of State Highway and Transportation Officials (AASHTO) or the Federal Highway Administration (FHWA), but is being used by the Georgia Department of Transportation and others to identify the highway. The number comes from the 3rd Infantry Division which is based in Georgia. Portions of the planned route, including the Savannah River Parkway, are already built to Interstate standards; the exact route has not been finalized, especially across the Appalachian Mountains northwest of Augusta, Georgia.

Interstate 7 or 9

Interstate 7 or Interstate 9 has been proposed by Caltrans for State Route 99 in central California. It would go from the split with I-5 at Wheeler Ridge (Wheeler Ridge Interchange) north through Bakersfield and Fresno to Stockton, where the proposed route turns west via the State Route 4 freeway to a terminus at I-5 in the central part of that city. An alternate proposed terminus is located at the I-5/US 50/Capital City Freeway junction in Sacramento, where the future Interstate, after continuing north from Stockton along Route 99, can turn west along the Capital City Freeway, already an Interstate route (unsigned I-305), to connect with I-5, which extends north toward Redding. This also serves as a connector to the existing northern portion of Highway 99. The future Interstate's prospects for development to appropriate standards are tied to the Caltrans "Route 99 Corridor Enhancement Master Plan"; this document posits that when and if Interstate status is conferred, the route will be designated either I-7 or I-9.

In August 2005, with the passage of that year's SAFETEA-LU federal transportation legislation, SR 99 from Wheeler Ridge to Stockton and beyond to Sacramento was designated as High Priority Corridor 54, the California Farm-to-Market Corridor; this legislation also designated that corridor as a future segment of the Interstate System.

Interstate 42

The Fixing America's Surface Transportation Act (FAST Act) added the US 70 corridor between Garner and Morehead City, North Carolina, to the Interstate system by defining it as, first, High Priority Corridor #82 and subsequently designating it as a future Interstate. The Regional Transportation Alliance expected this corridor to be called Interstate 46 or another suitable designation. At a meeting in La Grange, North Carolina, on March 17, 2016, the Super 70 Corridor Commission recommended that the designation of Interstate 50 be sought for the US 70 Interstate corridor. The rationale for the I-50 numerical selection was cited as a number not in conflict with either an existing Interstate designation or currently applied to a U.S. Highway within North Carolina. This recommendation was forwarded to NCDOT for submission to AASHTO.

For the AASHTO Special Committee on U.S. Route Numbering meeting in May 2016, NCDOT proposed I-36 for this route. However, AASHTO instead designated the route as Interstate 42.

In March 2022, the Federal Highway Administration designated the  Clayton Bypass and the  Goldsboro Bypass, which have been built to Interstate Highway standards, formally as Interstate 42. As of May 2022 signage has not been installed designating the new route.

Other proposals

Interstate 67

Interstate 67 has been a proposed number for at least three highways.

Indiana has proposed using the I-67 designation for the freeway upgrade of US 31 currently under construction between Indianapolis and South Bend, possibly continuing northward via the US 31 freeway to Benton Harbor, Michigan, and going northward from there along existing I-196 to Grand Rapids. The Indiana Senate unanimously passed a resolution calling for federal funding for this proposal and the I-67 designation in 2003. Meanwhile, Indiana expedited the upgrading of three major sections on US 31 between Indianapolis and South Bend including the Kokomo Bypass. This was done using funds received through the 2006 Major Moves deal. Such a proposal would put I-67 in the proper place in the grid (it is the only number available for that route).

I-67 was originally the designation given to a never-built highway connecting Kalamazoo, Michigan, to the east side of Elkhart, Indiana, as part of the original Interstate numbering plan in 1957.A planning map shows a freeway along this routing intersecting the Indiana Toll Road just west of the State Road 19 interchange. The Michigan State Highway Department officially requested switching the I-67 designation to a route from Benton Harbor to Grand Rapids in 1958, and in the process proposed the northerly extension of the original I-69 from the I-80/I-90/Indiana Toll Road to Lansing. The I-67 designation was denied by the American Association of State Highway and Transportation Officials which then assigned I-196 to the Benton Harbor to Grand Rapids route, west of the I-96 junction near Grand Rapids.

A third, much shorter, proposal in 2011 by the I-67 Development Corporation from the Owensboro, Kentucky, area involves continuing the proposed I-67 in Indiana along a route parallel to US 231 from Crane, Indiana, to Bowling Green, Kentucky. Much of the proposed route already exists and is close to Interstate grade. Only the northern third from Dale, Indiana, to Crane remains unfinished. It would use the Natcher Bridge to cross the Ohio River, Kentucky's I-165 and Indiana's Lincoln Parkway, an expressway facility that would need to be fully upgraded to Interstate standards. It would go around the cities of Jasper and Huntingburg in Indiana as well as Owensboro, Hartford, and Morgantown, Kentucky, and end at Bowling Green. It could also be linked to the first proposal by overlapping I-67 with the currently under construction I-69 from Indianapolis to Crane.

Interstate 92

As originally proposed by the Michigan State Highway Department in 1957, I-94 from Benton Harbor to Detroit would have been numbered Interstate 92. Since then, I-92 has been a proposed number for at least two highways.

Low population and natural barriers like the White Mountains have impeded economic development in northern New England. In the early 1970s, Maine, New Hampshire, Vermont and New York proposed two new Interstate Highway corridors:
 From Albany, New York, to Portsmouth, New Hampshire, incorporating the current route whose easternmost segment is New Hampshire Route 101.
 From Glens Falls, New York, to Calais, Maine (designated as I-92 and potentially linking to New Brunswick Route 1 near Calais, Maine), tracing U.S. Route 4 eastward through Vermont and New Hampshire.

The Federal Highway Administration ultimately did not approve these plans.

Northern New England is served by three north–south freeways radiating from Boston and by Interstate 91, which follows the Connecticut River. However, the northernmost complete east–west freeway in the region, Interstate 90 in Massachusetts, does not enter northern New England. East–west travel through northern New England is facilitated by three freeway segments:
 Interstate 89 between Montpelier, Vermont, and Burlington.
 US 4 west of Rutland, Vermont.
 New Hampshire Route 101 from Manchester, New Hampshire, eastward to the ocean.

Maine Senator Olympia Snowe said in 2004 that the region is disadvantaged by the fact that it was the only region in the US for which a federal High Priority Corridor was not designated in the 1991 Intermodal Surface Transportation Efficiency Act. In 2012, the east–west highway was again proposed, this time as a privately financed toll road.

Current backers of the highway propose an east–west axis through northern and central Maine, with three potential freeway links with Canada—two from Québec, and one from New Brunswick. One portion of the new highway would run from Interstate 395 in Brewer, Maine, to the Canadian border near Calais, with a direct link to New Brunswick Route 1, a major transportation corridor serving the Maritimes. A second would travel northwest from Interstate 95 near Waterville, Maine, to the Canadian border at Coburn Gore, with a connection to a proposed extension of Quebec Autoroute 10 toward Montreal. A third would travel due west from I-95 near Waterville, following the U.S. Route 2 corridor through Maine, New Hampshire, Vermont, and northern New York, with Quebec's Autoroute 73 having a southeasterly oriented southern end that heads for the Armstrong-Jackman Border Crossing, as Quebec Route 173 already reaches the United States at the same port of entry.

Interstate 98

As originally proposed by the Michigan State Highway Department in 1958, I-696 would have been numbered Interstate 98. Since then, another highway in Upstate New York and Vermont has been linked to the number. If built, the highway would likely follow the US 11 corridor across the northern part of New York's North Country, connecting I-81 to I-89.

A study called the North Country Transportation Study Action Plan and Final Technical Report suggests that the road would likely be built to Interstate Highway standards due to a lack of infrastructure throughout the area. Backers of the project have called for the highway to be designated as I-98; however, this designation has not been recognized by any government agencies, such as NYSDOT or the AASHTO. The number does fit into AASHTO's numbering system, though, as the highest even numbers are designated for highways running along the Canadian border, such as the proposed highway.

The Northern Corridor Transportation Group (NCTG) was formed in December 2008 as a means of refocusing the fifty-year discussion on the project. Since that time, more than 100 municipal and civic resolutions from the five northern counties of New York have been passed in support of the construction of the project. On July 16, 2009, the NCTG submitted a request to U.S. Senator Kirsten Gillibrand to direct $800 million toward the project as part of the reauthorization of a federal highway transportation bill. In a historic move, the six northern legislators representing the North Country in the New York State Legislature (Senators Aubertine, Griffo and Little and Assembly Members Scozzafava, Russell and Duprey) signed an official letter of request to the same end.

Interstate 99

In 2006, the Virginia General Assembly directed the Secretary of Transportation to initiate a study to determine the interest of affected states in the construction of a new Interstate highway (I-99). I-99 would allow long-distance travelers to bypass the I-95 bottleneck in the Baltimore–Washington metropolitan area. This would be separate from the existing Interstate 99 in New York and Pennsylvania.

I-99 would travel from I-95 in Wilson, North Carolina, to another point on I-95 in Christiana, Delaware ( from Wilmington, Delaware). It would renumber the controlled access Delaware Route 1 (DE 1) and would parallel U.S. Route 13 (US 13) through the Delmarva Peninsula and using the existing Chesapeake Bay Bridge–Tunnel. It would travel through Norfolk, Virginia, traveling concurrently with existing interstates where possible. I-99 would continue to travel parallel to US 13 until it enters North Carolina, where it would travel parallel to US 258 until ending on I-95 in Wilson.

Another option is for I-99 to parallel US 17 in North Carolina, and have it end in Charleston, South Carolina. One option that was never fully planned was to connect the proposed Christiana, Delaware, I-99 east coast section and existing Bedford, Pennsylvania, I-99 section by having I-99 travel concurrently with existing interstates including I-476 and I-76.

See also

Interstate 66 (Kansas–Kentucky), proposed but later canceled
Interstate 69, a partially constructed Interstate Highway consisting of 10 unconnected segments, plus an original continuous segment from Indianapolis to the Canadian border in Port Huron, Michigan. Plans include building a continuous Interstate Highway from the Mexican border in Laredo, Texas to Port Huron, Michigan.
Interstate 73, an Interstate located entirely in North Carolina but with plans to run from Myrtle Beach, South Carolina, to northern Michigan

References

External links
 Future Interstates and Potential Interstate Corridors at Interstate-Guide.com
 North Carolina's New and Future Interstates at Malmeroads.net

 
Lists of proposals